Doug Naidus (born December 30, 1965) is an American businessman who is the founder and chief executive officer of World Business Lenders, LLC.

Career in finance
Naidus founded IPI Skyscraper, a mortgage brokerage company, in 1988. Under his leadership, IPI Skyscraper transformed from a start-up to one of the largest mortgage brokers in the United States. In 1999, Naidus founded MortgageIT, a nationwide real estate investment trust and residential mortgage lending company, where he served as chairman and chief executive officer. The company, which funded $33 billion in residential mortgage loans, was listed publicly on the New York Stock Exchange in 2004 before being acquired by Deutsche Bank in 2007.

Deutsche Bank
Naidus held the position of Managing Director and Global Head of Residential Lending and Trading at Deutsche Bank from 2007 to 2011.

World Business Lenders
In 2011, Naidus founded and currently serves as chairman and chief executive officer of World Business Lenders, which has been described as a predatory lender.

Banned Brokers
In a Bloomberg article published on May 27, 2014, Naidus refused to comment when asked about predatory lending practices at World Business Lenders.  See https://www.fa-mag.com/news/what-some-of-wall-street-s-banned-brokers-are-doing-now-18091.html?print.

References

1965 births
Living people
American business executives
People from Queens, New York
People from Huntington, New York
Syracuse University alumni
Deutsche Bank people